Monika Ludmila Knejp (born 1 September 1970) is a Swedish rower. She competed in the women's lightweight double sculls event at the 1996 Summer Olympics.

References

1970 births
Living people
Swedish female rowers
Olympic rowers of Sweden
Rowers at the 1996 Summer Olympics
Sportspeople from Stockholm
20th-century Swedish women